Richard Lee "Bo" Dickinson (July 18, 1935 – November 6, 2012) was a professional American football running back who played six seasons in the American Football League (AFL). Dickinson was a 6th round selection (72nd overall pick) out of University of Southern Mississippi by the Chicago Bears of the National Football League in the 1957 NFL Draft. However, he would play for the Dallas Texans (1960–1961), the Denver Broncos (1962–1963),  the Houston Oilers (1963), and the Oakland Raiders (1964) of the AFL.

References

1935 births
Sportspeople from Hattiesburg, Mississippi
American football running backs
Southern Miss Golden Eagles football players
Dallas Texans (AFL) players
Denver Broncos (AFL) players
Houston Oilers players
Oakland Raiders players
2012 deaths
American Football League players